Percy Talbot Ames (13 December 1931 – 4 December 1998) was an English footballer who played as a goalkeeper in the Football League for Colchester United, where he made 422 appearances in all competitions between 1955 and 1965. He was also on the books at Tottenham Hotspur but did not make a first-team appearance.

Career
Born in Bedford, Ames began his career at Tottenham Hotspur in 1951 having arrived from now-defunct club Bedford Avenue. He failed to make a first-team appearance for Spurs between 1951 and 1955, and on the advice of the Tottenham first-team and England goalkeeper Ted Ditchburn, Colchester United manager Benny Fenton signed Ames up in 1955 following a short trial.

Ames made his first-team and Football League debut on 20 August 1955 in a 0–0 away draw with Exeter City, where Ames announced his arrival by saving a penalty kick. Over the period of ten years, Ames would make 397 Football League appearances for Colchester and made 422 appearances in all competitions. During one stint, he missed only three league games over a span of seven years, two of which were missed due to a fractured finger. His run included a spell of 224 consecutive games played for the club, starring in FA Cup runs and achieving promotion to the Third Division in the 1961–62 season. Ames was then made inaugural Colchester United Player of the Year at the end of the 1964–65 season, his final season with the club. At one point during his career, West Bromwich Albion came in with an offer for Ames, but keen to keep his custodian, manager Fenton decided not to tell him until two years later.

Ames' final appearance for the club to which he had dedicated ten years came on 26 February 1965, unfortunately for Ames, a 5–0 defeat at the hands of Queens Park Rangers. On leaving the U's, he turned out for non-league Romford before returning to Bedford to play for his hometown club Bedford Town.

Percy Ames died at the age of 66 on 4 December 1998. He was posthumously inducted into the Colchester United 'Hall of Fame' in 2010.

Career statistics

Honours

Club
Colchester United
1961–62 Football League Fourth Division runner-up (level 4)

Individual
1965 Colchester United Player of the Year

All honours referenced by:

References

External links

1931 births
1998 deaths
Sportspeople from Bedford
English footballers
Association football goalkeepers
Bedford Avenue F.C. players
Tottenham Hotspur F.C. players
Colchester United F.C. players
Romford F.C. players
Bedford Town F.C. players
English Football League players
Footballers from Bedfordshire